The University of South Dakota (USD) is a public research university in Vermillion, South Dakota. Established by the Dakota Territory legislature in 1862, 27 years before the establishment of the state of South Dakota, USD is the flagship university for the state of South Dakota and the state's oldest public university.

The university is home to South Dakota's only medical school and law school. It is also home to the National Music Museum, with over 15,000 American, European, and non-Western instruments. USD is governed by the South Dakota Board of Regents, and its president is Sheila Gestring. The university has been accredited by the North Central Association of College and Schools since 1913. It is classified among "R2: Doctoral Universities – High research activity".

University of South Dakota's alumni include a total of 17 Truman Scholars, 12 Rhodes Scholars, and 1 Nobel Laureate, (Ernest Lawrence '22, 1939 Nobel Prize in Physics.) The athletic teams compete in the NCAA's Division I as members of The Summit League, except football, which competes in the Missouri Valley Football Conference.

History
The University of South Dakota was founded in 1862 by the Dakota Territorial Legislature which authorized the establishment of the University at Vermillion. The authorization was unfunded, however, and classes did not begin until 20 years later under the auspices of the privately incorporated University of Dakota, created with support from the citizens of Clay County. Ephraim Epstein served as the first president and primary faculty member in the institution that opened in loaned space in downtown Vermillion. Before 1883 ended, the university had moved into Old Main, and the first public board was appointed to govern the institution.

Enrollment increased to 69 students by the end of 1883, and, by the time South Dakota became the 40th state in 1889, USD boasted an enrollment of 500 students. USD's first academic unit, the College of Arts and Sciences, was established in 1883. The School of Law began offering classes in 1901; the School of Medicine in 1907; Continuing Education in 1916; the Graduate School in 1927; and the College of Fine Arts in 1931. The School of Business began offering classes in 1927 and has been continuously accredited by the Association to Advance Collegiate Schools of Business (AACSB) since 1949.

It is the state's oldest public university and is one of six universities governed by the South Dakota Board of Regents. USD has been accredited by the Higher Learning Commission of the North Central Association of Colleges and Schools since 1913 and is a member of the Association of Public and Land-Grant Universities. The school houses the state's only law and medical schools and the lone College of Fine Arts.

USD is also home to the state's oldest and largest political science department. Within the program is the Farber Fund, named for storied university professor emeritus Dr. William O. Farber, which provides subsidy to political science and criminal justice majors to attend conferences, participate in study tours, complete internships, and study abroad.

The Sanford School of Medicine, a community-based program, emphasizes family medicine and primary care with the support and participation by practicing physicians and community hospitals throughout the state. Community hospitals and clinics provide teaching sites and the practicing physicians are teachers. The Lee Medical Sciences building houses the basic science education.

Campus
The University of South Dakota is based on a  campus along the bluffs near the Missouri River in the southeast corner of the state. The most prominent academic facility on campus, one of the school's symbols, is Old Main. It was built in 1883, burned down in 1893, and was fully restored in 1997. Along with several classrooms, it houses the Oscar Howe Gallery and the University Honors Program. Farber Hall, a 190-seat theater used mainly for speaking engagements, is also in Old Main.

Campus and academic buildings

USD opened the newly constructed Theodore R. and Karen K. Muenster University Center (MUC) for student use on February 17, 2009. The MUC houses the Student Activities Center, a campus dining facility, coffee shop, bookstore, convenience store and a number of lounge and TV areas. It was expanded on January 13, 2014, to include more food and entertainment options.

One of the newest additions to the campus is the Al Neuharth Media Center, named for the founder of USA Today. Dedicated in September 2003, the Neuharth Center houses the news and media organizations on campus, including the Freedom Forum’s South Dakota operations, South Dakota Public Broadcasting, the Department of Contemporary Media and Journalism, the campus newspaper The Volante, campus radio station KAOR, and television station KYOT. Formerly an armory and athletic field house, the building was converted into a media center through donations made by Al Neuharth, a 1950 USD graduate.

USD's Beacom School of Business moved into a new building in the fall of 2009. The previous building, Patterson Hall, is used as office space.

Galleries 
The University of South Dakota has two main galleries: The John A. Day Gallery located in the Fine Arts building and the Oscar Howe Gallery located in Old Main. There are several other locations across campus that are designated gallery space, such as the hallway on the second floor of the Muenster University Center.

Wellness Center & Dakota Dome
A $15 million,  wellness center opened in the spring of 2011. Located just north of the Warren M. Lee Center for the Fine Arts, the center includes state-of-the-art workout equipment, a multi-story climbing wall, multiple courts for basketball and volleyball, racquetball courts, and a three-lane walking/jogging track.

The DakotaDome serves not only as the home venue for the school's football, softball, swimming, basketball, volleyball, and track and field teams, but also as a recreational center for the student body. It is South Dakota's only domed football stadium, hosting the state's high school football championships in November.

Housing

North Complex consists of four residence halls: Beede, Mickelson, Richardson and Olson. Richardson is the only non-freshmen hall in North Complex. Coed-floors in the North Complex house men and women on the same floor on opposite sides with lounges, laundry and restrooms as a visual barrier.

Burgess/Norton Complex are located just south of North Complex. Burgess and Norton Halls are near Dakota, Noteboom, East Hall, Delzell Education Center, and the Arts and Sciences Building. They consist of 3 floors each with single-sex floors and typically house sophomores.

Other residence halls include McFadden Hall, Coyote Village, and Brookman. McFadden Hall is for non-freshmen, graduate, professional and non-traditional students, outfitted with 25 four-person apartments and furnished individual single bedrooms. Brookman hall is single rooms for upperclassmen, international students and graduate students. Coyote Village, the university's newest residence complex, opened in 2010. Located just south of the DakotaDome, the four-story, 175-unit complex provides suite-style and apartment living for 548 students. Monthly rental rates for Coyote Village range from $453 to $658. All units are fully furnished and have wireless Internet. Coyote Village housing is available to all students. All full scholarship athletes live in Coyote Village.

Academics

The University of South Dakota has the state's only law and medical schools. , the university has seven colleges and universities offering 205 undergraduate and 75 graduate programs, including:

 College of Arts and Sciences
 Beacom School of Business
 School of Education
 College of Fine Arts
 School of Health Sciences
 School of Law
 School of Medicine

Student life
The University of South Dakota has over 170 student organizations.

Greek life
Fraternities include the following:
Phi Delta Theta
Delta Tau Delta
Beta Theta Pi
Sigma Alpha Epsilon
Tau Kappa Epsilon
Lambda Chi Alpha
Pi Kappa Alpha

Sororities include the following:
Pi Beta Phi
Kappa Alpha Theta
Alpha Phi
Alpha Xi Delta

Homecoming – Dakota Days 
The homecoming tradition of Dakota Days started in 1914 under President Robert L. Slagle. In 2014, USD celebrated its 100th Dakota Days.

Media

Student media
Through the Media and Journalism department, the University of South Dakota offers three opportunities for students to gain experience working with different media outlets: Coyote News, Coyote Radio, and The Volante.

Coyote News
In fall 2005, USD's Media & Journalism Department revived its weekly live 30-minute television newscast, Coyote News. It is entirely produced, directed & reported by USD students. The newscast airs Wednesdays at 5:00 PM with an encore broadcast at 6:00 PM on KYOT-TV, Cable Channel 21. The newscast can be viewed throughout Vermillion as well as numerous other cities in southeast South Dakota. Radio newscasts began airing Wednesdays at noon on KAOR-FM, 91.1 Coyote Radio.  The 10 minute live radio newscast is entirely produced and reported by USD students.  The individual stories and features of Coyote News Radio and TV can be viewed online. Coyote News Daily Updates can be viewed through social media and heard daily on Coyote Radio. The KYOT-TV and KAOR-FM studios are located in the Al Neuharth Media Center on USD's campus.

Coyote Radio
In 2011 KAOR FM was renamed Coyote Radio, following the University of South Dakota's decision to end the U. Campaign.  The central on-campus headquarters for KAOR Radio is the Al Neuharth Media Center while the transmitter lies atop Slagle Hall on USD's campus.

The Volante
The Volante (Spanish for "steering wheel") has served as the campus newspaper since 1887. It is published every Wednesday morning during the school year.  Managed entirely by students, The Volante prides itself on its editorial independence. The paper has won numerous awards, including a number of Best of Show and Pacemakers. In October 2011 it was awarded its 8th Pacemaker Award, sometimes called the Pulitzer Prize of college journalism, by the Associated Collegiate Press.

The paper includes news, sports, opinion and verve (arts and entertainment) sections. The paper also has a frequently updated website, which includes campus news, staff blogs and podcasts. The Volante generally maintains a staff of 50 students.

Department media
The Vermillion Literary Project Magazine is a literary journal published by the English Department of the University of South Dakota. The VLP Magazine is staffed by undergraduate and graduate students in the school and advised by faculty. Submissions are received from around the world and evaluated via a blind review. The award-winning publication is annual and in 2012 will celebrate its 30th year of press.

South Dakota Public Broadcasting
The university is home to South Dakota Public Broadcasting, or SDPB for short. It is a network of Public Broadcasting Service (PBS) television and NPR radio stations serving the state of South Dakota. The stations are operated by the South Dakota Bureau of Information and Telecommunication, a state agency. The studios and offices are located at 500 N. Dakota Avenue in the Al Neuharth Media Center on the west edge of campus.

Recognition
The Department of Political Science holds a number of popular speaker forums. The department has produced thirteen Truman Scholars, as well as four Rhodes Scholars.

William O. Farber storied professor of Political Science is attributed with growing in developing the program. Upon his death 'Doc' Farber gifted the University with his house and other assets were established as the Farber Internship and Travel Fund, which funds students of Political Science for experiential learning opportunities.

Athletics

The University of South Dakota sponsors six sports for men (football, basketball, swimming & diving, cross country, track & field and golf) and nine sports for women (basketball, swimming & diving, cross country, track & field, golf, soccer, softball, tennis and volleyball). The school's athletic teams are called the "Coyotes" (pronounced Ki Yoat) and nicknamed the "Yotes" (Yoats). The school colors are red and white. USD competes at the NCAA Division I level (Football Championship Subdivision in football) and is a member of The Summit League for all sports except football.  Its football team is a member of the Missouri Valley Football Conference. Athletic facilities include the DakotaDome, for football and indoor track, the Sanford Coyote Sports Center for volleyball and men's and women's basketball, First Bank & Trust Soccer Complex and Lillibridge Track Complex.

The long-time intrastate rivalry between the Coyotes and South Dakota State Jackrabbits ended in 2003 when SDSU moved to Division I athletics and the Coyotes remained in Division II.  USD eventually moved up to Division I and in the 2011–2012 academic year, SDSU and USD resumed regularly scheduled contests in most sports when the Coyotes joined the athletics conferences in which SDSU was a member, the Summit League and the Missouri Valley Football Conference.

The University of South Dakota fight songs include South Dakota Victory, Hail South Dakota and Get Along Coyotes.

The University of South Dakota's mascot of Coyotes comes from a horse race in 1863 in which a Dakota horse outran a horse from Iowa, in which someone from Iowa stated, "look at the Kiote run."

Notable alumni and faculty

Among the thousands of graduates from the University of South Dakota, notable alumni in the field of journalism include Al Neuharth, founder of the USA Today B.A., 1946; Greg Mortenson, author of Three Cups of Tea and Stones into Schools B.A., 1983; Tom Brokaw, American broadcaster and longtime NBC Nightly News anchor B.A., 1964.

The University is notable for its numerous alumni in the field of politics and government including former U.S. Senators James Abourezk, Tim Johnson, Larry Pressler; and current U.S. Representative Dusty Johnson as well current U.S. Senator John Thune.

References

External links

 
 University of South Dakota Athletics website
 
 
 
 

 
University of South Dakota
Buildings and structures in Vermillion, South Dakota
Education in Clay County, South Dakota
Educational institutions established in 1862
1862 establishments in Dakota Territory
Tourist attractions in Clay County, South Dakota
Flagship universities in the United States
Universities and colleges accredited by the Higher Learning Commission